Wild Records  is a record label based in Los Angeles, California(business side) . Started by Reb Kennedy, the label specializes in Rockabilly, Rock and Roll, Blues, Soul, and other roots music.

History 
Wild Records was formed in 2001. The first band that was signed to the label was Lil Luis y Los Wild Teens, who recorded a Mexican rock and roll song called La Rebeldona. Since that first 45 R.P.M. release, Wild Records has worked to sign, promote, book, and record  artists. They have been widely celebrated for their artists' unique ability to make contemporary music while still remaining authentic and true to the original styles that have inspired them. Acts on the label regularly headline worldwide rockabilly and rock n' roll festivals such as The Rockabilly Rave, High Rockabilly, Viva Las Vegas, Sjock Festival and Let's Get Wild. Wild Records and founder Reb Kennedy is the subject of an independent film release entitled Los Wild Ones in 2013. The film has toured the international film circuit to generally positive praise. The film is noteworthy in that it concentrates on not just music, but the personal relationships of the musicians inside

Wild Records Europe 

On September 1, 2015, the label announced the start of a European division Wild Records Europe.

Roster

 Alex Vargas
 Barny and the Rhythm Allstars
 Bebo and the Goodtime Boys
 Bibi and Her Tremblin' Souls
 Black Mambas
 Bobby Wilson
 Carl and the Rhythm Allstars
 Carlos and the Bandidos
 Carlos Mejuto
 Chuy and the Bobcats
 Craig Shaw and the Illuminators
 Darrel Higham
 Dasta and the Smokin' Snakes
 Deadly Spirits
 Dusty Chance and the Allnighters
 Eddie and thee Scorpions
 Eddie Clendening
 Elvis Cantu
 Furious
 Gizzelle
 Isaac Webb Trio
 Israel Proulx
 Jake Allen
 Jeff Beware and the Bop Thrills
 Jerry Cochran and the Salt Flat Trio
 Jimmy Dale and the Beltline
 Jittery Jack
 Josh Hi-Fi and the Rhythm Kings
 Lew Philips
 Lightnin' Jay & Hammer Rob
 Lil Luis Y Los Wild Teens
 Lil Sal and the Wildtones
 Little Victor
 Los Blancos
 Los Killertones
 Luis and the Wildfires
 |Mary Simich
 Mozzy Dee
 Omar and the Stringpoppers
 Omar Romero
 Pachuco Jose
 Pat Capocci
 Pat James
 Paul O and the Rough Diamonds
 Rockin' Rick and the Rhythm Wranglers
 Roy Dee and the Spitfires
 Rusty and the Dragstrip Trio
 Santos
 Savage Breed
 Sean Coleman and the Quasars
 Shanda and the Howlers
 Smokehouse Dave
 Sonny West
 Texas Steve
 The Attention
 The Bad Situations
 The Barbwires
 The Blue Rhythm Boys
 The Boss Tides
 The Caezars
 The Desperados
 The Devil Winds
 The Downbeats
 The Dragtones
 The Greasemarks
 The Hexxers
 The Hi-Boys
 The Hi-Jivers
 The Hi-Strung Ramblers
 The Hi-Tone Boppers
 The Hi-Tones
 The Hurricanes
 The Montesas
 The Neumans
 The Nightimes
 The Red Hot Rockets
 The Rhythm Shakers
 The Rhythm Torpedoes
 The Sparks Boys
 The Stompin' Riffraffs
 The Straynge
 The Terrorsaurs
 The Vargas Brothers
 The Wild Goners
 Tiny and Mary
 TJ Mayes
 Trio Renacimiento
 Will and the Hi-Rollers

References 
 

 LA Weekly, Dragtones Article
 LA Times Magazine, Wild Records Article
 LA Record Magazine, Luis and The Wildfires Article
 Metro Times, Wild Records Article
 Vimby Wild Records special

External links 
 Official Wild Records website
 Official Wild Records Europe website

American independent record labels
Companies based in Los Angeles